The Mauritanian ambassador in Berlin is the official representative of the Government in Nouakchott to the Government of Germany.

List of representatives

References 

 
Germany
Mauritania